Entry is an unincorporated community located in Pendleton County, West Virginia, United States. It lies on the eastern flank of Entry Mountain to the west of Franklin. It is the offseason home of CFL Agent Scott Ian Ambinder.

References

Unincorporated communities in Pendleton County, West Virginia
Unincorporated communities in West Virginia